Taejo of Goryeo (31 January 877 – 4 July 943), also known as Taejo Wang Geon, was the founder of the Goryeo dynasty, which ruled Korea from the 10th to the 14th century. Taejo ruled from 918 to 943, achieving unification of the Later Three Kingdoms in 936.

Background
Wang Geon was born in 877 to a powerful maritime merchant family based in Songak (modern Kaesong) as the eldest son of Wang Ryung. According to the Pyeonnyeon tongnok (편년통록; 編年通錄), quoted in the Goryeosa, Wang Geon's grandfather Jakjegeon was the son of Emperor Suzong of Tang. According to the Encyclopedia of Korean Culture and the Doosan Encyclopedia, this is hagiographical. The Pyeonnyeon tongnok (c. late 12th century) said: While on a sea voyage to meet his father, Emperor Suzong of the Tang dynasty, 16-year-old Jakjegeon encountered a dragon king, slayed a shape-shifting fox, and married a dragon woman; the dragon woman later transformed into a dragon and went away. According to the Seongwollok (성원록; 聖源錄), quoted in the Goryeosa, the "dragon woman" was a daughter of Dueunjeomgakgan from Pyeongju (Pyongsan County). Modern historians believe that Wang Geon's ancestors were a powerful clan that conducted maritime trade with China for generations. According to the Gaoli tujing (c. early 12th century) by the Song dynasty envoy Xu Jing, Wang Geon's ancestors were Goguryeo nobility. According to Jang Deokho: His ancestors were Goguryeo refugees who settled around Songak, accumulating great wealth through maritime trade and gaining control of the region, including the Ryesong River. During the Later Silla period, the northern regions, including Songak, were the strongholds of Goguryeo refugees, and Wang Geon's hometown of Songak would become the original capital of Later Goguryeo in 901.

Rise to power
Taejo began his career in the turbulent Later Three Kingdoms. In the later years of Silla, many local leaders and bandits rebelled against the rule of Queen Jinseong, who did not have strong enough leadership or policies to improve the condition of the people. Among those rebels, Gung Ye (궁예; 弓裔) of the northwestern region and Gyeon Hwon (견훤; 甄萱) of the southwest gained more power. They defeated and absorbed many of the other rebel groups as their troops marched against local Silla officials and bandits. In 895, Gung Ye led his forces into the far northwestern part of Silla, where Songdo was located. Taejo's father, Wang Yung (later Sejo of Goryeo), along with many local clans, quickly surrendered to Gung Ye. Wang Geon followed his father into service under Gung Ye, the future leader of Taebong, and he began his service under Gungye's command.

Wang Geon's ability as a military commander was soon recognized by Gung Ye, who promoted him to general and even regarded him as his brother. In 900, he led a successful campaign against local clans and the army of Later Baekje in the Chungju area, gaining more fame and recognition from the king. In 903, he led a famous naval campaign against the southwestern coastline of Hubaekje (Keumsung, later Naju), while Gyeon Hwon was at war against Silla. He led several more military campaigns, and also helped conquered people who lived in poverty under Silla rule. The public favored him due to his leadership and generosity.

In 913, he was appointed as prime minister of the newly renamed Taebong. Its king, Gung Ye, whose leadership helped found the kingdom but who began to refer to himself as the Buddha, began to persecute people who expressed their opposition against his religious arguments. He executed many monks, then later even his own wife and two sons, and the public began to turn away from him. His costly rituals and harsh rule caused even more opposition.

Rise to the throne and founding of Goryeo

In 918, four top-ranked generals of Taebong—Hong Yu (홍유; 洪儒), Bae Hyeongyeong (배현경; 裵玄慶), Shin Sung-gyeom (신숭겸; 申崇謙) and Bok Jigyeom (복지겸; 卜智謙)—met secretly and agreed to overthrow Gung Ye's rule and crown Wang Geon as their new king. Wang Geon first opposed the idea but later agreed to their plan. The same year Gung Ye was overthrown and killed near the capital, Cheorwon. The generals installed Wang Geon as the new king of this short-lived state. He renamed the kingdom Goryeo, thus beginning the Goryeo Dynasty. The next year he moved the capital back to his hometown, Gaegyeong.

He promoted Buddhism as Goryeo's national religion, and laid claim to the northern parts of the Korean Peninsula and Manchuria, which he considered his rightful legacy as the successor of Goguryeo. According to the Goryeosa, in 918, the ancient capital of Pyongyang had been in ruins for a long time and foreign barbarians were using the surrounding lands as hunting grounds and occasionally raiding the borders of Goryeo; therefore, in his first year as king, Wang Geon ordered his subjects to repopulate the ancient capital, and soon sent his cousin Wang Sik-ryeom to defend it. Afterward, he decreed Pyongyang as the Western Capital. He also sought alliances and cooperation with local clans rather than trying to conquer and bring them under his direct control.

The War of the Later Three Kingdoms
In 927, Gyeon Hwon of Hubaekje led forces into Silla's capital, Gyeongju, capturing and executing its king, King Gyeongae. Then he established King Gyeongsun as his puppet monarch before he turned his army toward Goryeo. Hearing of the news, Taejo planned a strike with 5,000 cavalrymen to attack Gyeon's troops on the way back home at Gongsan near Daegu. He met Hubaekje forces and suffered disastrous defeat, losing most of his army including his generals Kim Nak and Shin Sung-gyeom, the very same man who crowned Wang as a king. However, Goryeo quickly recovered from defeat and successfully defended Hubaekje's attack on its front.

In 935, the last king of Silla, King Gyeongsun, felt there was no way to revive his kingdom and surrendered his entire land to Taejo. Taejo gladly accepted his surrender and gave him the title of prince, and accepted his daughter as one of his wives (Wang had six queens, and many more wives as he married daughters of every single local leader). It caused much disgust to Gyeon Hwon. Gyeon's father, who held his own claim to the Sangju region, also defected and surrendered to Goryeo and was received as the father of a king.

In the same year, Gyeon Hwon's oldest son, Gyeon Singeom, led a coup with his brothers Yanggeom and Yonggeom, against their father, who favored their half-brother, Geumgang, as his successor to the throne. Gyeon Hwon was sent into exile and imprisoned in Geumsansa, but escaped to Goryeo and was treated like Taejo's father, who died just before his surrender.

Goryeo victory and unification
In 936, Wang led his final campaign against Singeom of Later Baekje. Singeom fought against Taejo, but facing much disadvantage and inner conflict, he surrendered to Taejo. Wang finally occupied Hubaekje formally, and unified the nation for the second time since Unified Silla; he ruled until 943, and died from disease.

Taejo sought to bring even his enemies into his ruling coalition. He gave titles and land to rulers and nobles from the various countries he had defeated: Later Baekje, Silla, and also Balhae, which disintegrated around the same time. Thus he sought to secure stability and unity for his kingdom which had been lacking in the later years of Silla.

After the destruction of Balhae by the Khitans in 926, Balhae's last crown prince and much of its ruling class sought refuge in Goryeo, where they were warmly welcomed and included into the ruling family by Wang Geon, thus uniting the two successor nations of Goguryeo. Taejo felt a strong familial kinship with Balhae, calling it his "Relative Country" and "Married Country", and protected Balhae refugees, many of whom were also of Goguryeo origin. This was in strong contrast to Later Silla, which had endured a hostile relationship with Balhae.

Taejo displayed strong animosity toward the Khitans who had destroyed Balhae. The Liao dynasty sent 30 envoys with 50 camels as a gift in 942, but Wang Geon exiled the envoys and starved the camels under a bridge in retribution for Balhae, despite the major diplomatic repercussions. Taejo proposed to Gaozu of Later Jìn that they attack the Khitans as revenge for the destruction of Balhae, according to the Zizhi Tongjian. Furthermore, in his Ten Mandates to his descendants, he stated that the Khitans are no different from beasts and should be guarded against.

Legacy

The unification of the Later Three Kingdoms in 936 was very important in Korean history; the unification of 668 CE by Silla was only a unification of approximately half of the peoples of the Korean Peninsula and its vicinity (who at the time largely considered themselves one people divided among many states), since the northern part was ruled by Balhae, which asserted itself as a reincarnation of Goguryeo. However, Wang Geon's unification in 936 was a more complete unification (in which only a single state emerged among the people, as opposed to the 7th century, when two, Unified Silla and Balhae, emerged); the people of the Korean Peninsula thereafter remained under a single, unified state until 1948, when Korea was divided into north and south by Soviets and U.S forces.

The modern name of "Korea" is derived from the name "Goryeo," which itself is derived from "Goguryeo," to whose heritage (and by extension, territory) Wang Geon and his new kingdom laid claim. As the first ruler to more fully unite the people of the Korean Peninsula under a single state, many modern-day Koreans look to his example for applicability to the current state of division on the Korean Peninsula.

During the early Goryeo dynasty, the title of crown prince was only a peerage title for sons of the king; a separate title existed for the heir apparent.

Family
Great-grandmother: Queen Jeonghwa (정화왕후)
Grandfather: Uijo of Goryeo (고려 의조)
Grandmother: Queen Wonchang (원창왕후)
Father: Sejo of Goryeo (고려 세조)
Mother: Queen Wisuk (위숙왕후)
Consorts and their Respective Issue(s):
Queen Sinhye of the Jeongju Ryu clan (신혜왕후 류씨) – No issue.
Queen Janghwa of the Naju O clan (장화왕후 오씨)
 Crown Prince Wang Mu (912 – 23 October 945) (정윤 왕무)
Queen Sinmyeongsunseong of the Chungju Yu clan (신명순성왕후 유씨)
Wang Tae (왕태)
 Wang Yo (923 – 13 April 949) (왕요)
 Wang So (925 – 4 July 975) (왕소)
Wang Jeong, King Munwon the Great (왕정 문원대왕)
Jeungtongguksa (증통국사)
Princess Nakrang (낙랑공주)
Princess Heungbang (흥방궁주)
Queen Sinjeong of the Hwangju Hwangbo clan (900 – 19 August 983) (신정왕후 황보씨)
Wang Uk (왕욱; d. 969)
Queen Daemok (대목왕후)
Queen Sinseong of the Gyeongju Gim clan (신성왕후 김씨)
Wang Uk (왕욱; d. 996)
Queen Jeongdeok of the Jeongju Ryu clan (정덕왕후 류씨)
Prince Wangwi (왕위군)
Prince Inae (인애군)
Prince Wonjang (원장태자)
Prince Joyi (조이군)
Queen Munhye (문혜왕후)
Queen Seonui (선의왕후)
Princess Wang (공주 왕씨)
Grand Lady Heonmok of the Pyeong clan (헌목대부인 평씨)
Prince Sumyeong (수명태자)
Lady Jeongmok of the Wang clan (정목부인 왕씨)
Grand Royal Consort Sunan (순안왕대비)
Lady Dongyangwon of the Pyeongsan Yu clan (동양원부인 유씨)
Wang Ui, Prince Hyomok (왕의 효목태자)
Wang Won, Prince Hyoeun (왕원 효은태자)
Lady Sukmok of the Im clan (숙목부인 임씨)
Prince Wonnyeong (원녕태자; d. 976)
Lady Cheonanbuwon of the Im clan (천안부원부인 임씨)
Wang Imju, Prince Hyoseong (왕임주 효성태자; d. 976)
Prince Hyoji (효지태자)
Lady Heungbokwon of the Hongju Hong clan (흥복원부인 홍씨)
Wang Jik (왕직)
Princess Wang (공주 왕씨)
Lady Daeryangwon of the Hapcheon Yi clan (대량원부인 이씨) – No issue.
Lady Hudaeryangwon of the Yi clan (후대량원부인 이씨) – No issue.
Lady Daemyeongjuwon of the Wang clan (대명주원부인 왕씨) – No issue.
Lady Gwangjuwon of the Wang clan (광주원부인 왕씨) – No issue.
Lady Sogwangjuwon of the Wang clan (소광주원부인 왕씨)
Prince Gwangjuwon (광주원군; d. 945)
Lady Dongsanwon of the Suncheon Bak clan (동산원부인 박씨) – No issue.
Lady Yehwa of the Haeju Wang clan (예화부인 왕씨) – No issue.
Lady Daeseowon of the Dongju Gim clan (대서원부인 김씨) – No issue.
Lady Soseowon of the Dongju Gim clan (소서원부인 김씨) – No issue.
Lady Seojeonwon (서전원부인) – No issue.
Lady Sinjuwon of the Gang clan (신주원부인 강씨) – No issue.
Lady Wolhwawon (월화원부인) – No issue.
Lady Sohwangjuwon (소황주원부인)  – No issue.
Lady Seongmu of the Pyeongsan Bak clan (성무부인 박씨)
Prince Hyoje (효제태자)
Prince Hyomyeong (효명태자)
Prince Beopdeung (법등군)
Prince Jari (자리군)
Princess Wang (공주 왕씨)
Lady Uiseongbuwon of the Uiseong Hong clan (의성부원부인 홍씨)
Grand Prince Uiseongbuwon (의성부원대군)
Lady Wolgyeongwon of the Pyeongsan Bak clan (월경원부인 박씨) – No issue.
Lady Mongryangwon of the Pyeongsan Bak clan (몽량원부인 박씨) – No issue.
Lady Haeryangwon (해량원부인) – No issue.

Popular culture
 Portrayed by Kim Myeong-jin in the 1970 film Wang-geon, the Great.
 Portrayed by Choi Soo-jong and Oh Hyun-chul in the 2000-2002 KBS1 TV series Taejo Wang Geon.
Portrayed by Lee Mun-soo in the 2002–2003 KBS TV series The Dawn of the Empire.
Portrayed by Joo Myung Nam in the 2009 KBS TV series Empress Cheonchu.
 Portrayed by Nam Kyung-eup in the 2015 MBC TV series Shine or Go Crazy.
 Portrayed by Jo Min-ki in the 2016 SBS TV series Moon Lovers: Scarlet Heart Ryeo.
Leads the Korean civilization the games Sid Meier's Civilization III and IV

See also

Family tree of the Goryeo Dynasty
Rulers of Korea
History of Korea
Wang (family name)
Tomb of King Wanggon
Founding legends of the Goryeo royal family
Taejo Wang Geon (TV series)

References

External links

 

877 births
943 deaths
Korean generals
9th-century rulers in Asia
10th-century Korean monarchs
Goryeo writers
People from Kaesong
Founding monarchs
Korean Buddhist monarchs